William Beckman (May 12, 1881 – June 14, 1933) was an American wrestler who competed in the 1904 Summer Olympics. In 1904, he won the silver medal in the freestyle welterweight competition. Beckmann was born in New York City.

References

External links
William Beckman's profile at Sports Reference.com

1881 births
1933 deaths
Wrestlers at the 1904 Summer Olympics
American male sport wrestlers
Olympic silver medalists for the United States in wrestling
Sportspeople from New York City
Medalists at the 1904 Summer Olympics